The Downtown Pomeroy Historic District is a  historic district that was listed on the National Register of Historic Places (NRHP) in 2003.  It is roughly bounded by Main St., Tenth and Ninth Sts., Columbia St., and Sixth St. in Pomeroy, Washington.

The Garfield County Courthouse, which was designed by Charles Burggraf and is separately NRHP-listed, is one of its 42 contributing buildings.  It includes Italianate and  Gothic Revival architecture.

It was deemed significant "as an intact concentration of building[s] reflecting the early development of Pomeroy as the leading business, governmental, trading,
and shipping center of Garfield County."  Pomeroy grew in the 1870s when dryland wheat farming took off and further in 1886 when a railroad arrived and the town became the Garfield County seat.  It is notable for its "excellent collection of primarily commercial buildings" dating from the 1880s to the 1950s.

References

Gothic Revival architecture in Washington (state)
Italianate architecture in Washington (state)
Buildings and structures completed in 1887
National Register of Historic Places in Garfield County, Washington
Historic districts on the National Register of Historic Places in Washington (state)